Raphitoma christfriedi is a species of sea snail, a marine gastropod mollusk in the family Raphitomidae.

Description
The length of the shell varies between 10 mm and 14 mm.

Distribution
This marine species occurs off South Angola.

References

External links
 Rolán E., Otero-Schmitt J. & Fernandes F. (1998) The family Turridae s. l. (Mollusca, Neogastropoda) in Angola (West Africa). 1. Subfamily Daphnellinae. Iberus, 16: 95–118
 MNHN, Paris: holotype
 

Endemic fauna of Angola
christfriedi
Gastropods described in 1998